The Genie of Sutton Place is a 1973 supernatural young adult novel by George Selden, who was most famous for The Cricket in Times Square. Sutton Place was Selden's second most popular novel after the Times Square series, but as it began to deal with more mature themes, its accessibility to children was somewhat more limited. Selden, who was bisexual, generally kept his personal life outside his works directed at youngsters. Together with William Sleator, this makes him the second widely read bisexual children's book writer, cultural prejudice of which required silence at a time when HIV was ravaging the gay-bisex community.

Synopsis
Sutton Place deals with a young man, his coming-of-age, and a thousand-year old genie. Interactions of absolute power (supernatural) vs. daily life are examined; action and adventure unfold in conjunction with a transformed dog.

Plot 
Timothy Farr is a 13-year-old boy living in Greenwich Village, New York, with his dog, Sam, his father, Lorenzo Jr., and Madame Sosostris, a struggling antique dealer, when his father dies in an archaeological accident. He goes to live with his aunt, Lucy Farr, in Sutton Place who soon gives Sam to the pound, claiming to be allergic to him. Timothy will need the help of an ancient Arabian genie, his late father's journal, and dumb luck to keep his cover and save Sam.

Reception

The New York Times gave Sutton Place a mixed review but Kirkus Reviews called it "brisk and breathless". Since then, the book has remained a topic of study at the grade school level.

References

External links 

 

1973 American novels
American young adult novels
Supernatural novels